Netřebice is name of several locations in the Czech Republic: 
Netřebice (Český Krumlov District), a village in Český Krumlov District
Netřebice (Nymburk District), a village in Nymburk District